Petrine Sonne (25 November 1870 – 26 May 1946) was a Danish stage and film actress.

Born Johanne Petrine Møller in Copenhagen, she was the sister of actor and cartoonist Valdemar Møller.

Filmography
Du skal ære din hustru - 1925 
Barken Margrethe af Danmark - 1934
København, Kalundborg og - ? - 1934
Prisoner Number One - 1935
The Golden Smile (1935)
Millionærdrengen - 1936
Bolettes brudefærd - 1938
Alle går rundt og forelsker sig - 1941
Thummelumsen - 1941
En mand af betydning - 1941
Tag til Rønneby kro - 1941
Tobiasnætter - 1941
Tror du jeg er født i går? - 1941
En herre i kjole og hvidt - 1942
Et skud før midnat - 1942
Hans onsdagsveninde - 1943
Bedstemor går amok - 1944
Biskoppen - 1944
Det kære København - 1944
Mordets melodi - 1944
Otte akkorder - 1944
Spurve under taget - 1944
To som elsker hinanden - 1944
Man elsker kun een gang - 1945
Billet mrk. - 1946

External links

 Petrine Sonne at Danskefilm.dk

Danish stage actresses
Danish film actresses
Danish silent film actresses
20th-century Danish actresses
1870 births
1946 deaths